All Boys Are Called Patrick is a 1957 French short film written by Éric Rohmer and directed by Jean-Luc Godard and made before both filmmakers achieved fame as French New Wave filmmakers.

Plot 
A pickup artist / womanizer named Patrick inadvertently pursues two young women who actually happen to be roommates.

Selected Cast
 Jean-Claude Brialy - Patrick
 Anne Collette - Charlotte
 Nicole Berger - Véronique

DVD release
The film can be found on the Criterion Collection DVD for Godard's Une femme est une femme.

References

External links

1957 films
1950s French-language films
French comedy short films
French black-and-white films
Films directed by Jean-Luc Godard
1957 short films
1950s French films